Riverside State Park is a Washington state park located  northwest of Spokane in the community of Nine Mile Falls. The park protects  of Okanagan dry forest along the Spokane and Little Spokane rivers. It is the second largest state park in Washington after Mount Spokane State Park and is a popular recreation area for locals.

History
The park came into being with various gifts of land in 1933 and 1934. It was developed by members of the Civilian Conservation Corps. Evidence of the CCC's work can be seen at the Bowl and Pitcher area's suspension bridge, kitchen shelter, restroom, park residence, office, and maintenance shop. CCC workers also constructed the rock walls and much of the roadway of Aubrey White Parkway, the restroom on the Centennial Trail near the Carlson Trailhead, and various trails in the park.

Features

The Spokane House Interpretive Center has exhibits about the Spokane Indians, early pioneers, fur trappers, traders, the area's fort and military history, and Spokane House, the fur trading post established nearby. Numerous hiking and biking trails exist throughout the park.

Activities and amenities
Park activities include camping, fishing, swimming, picnicking, boating, canoeing, kayaking, bird watching, wildlife viewing, ATV riding, horseback riding, biking, hiking and rock climbing. Campgrounds are located at the Bowl and Pitcher, Nine Mile Recreation Area, and Lake Spokane.

The Bowl and Pitcher campground offers 16 standard campsites and 16 partial hookup sites, the Nine Mile campground has three tent sites, 17 partial hookup sites and four full hookup sites, and the Lake Spokane campground has 11 primitive campsites.  There are two group campsites at the Bowl and Pitcher campground that can accommodate 40-60 tent campers.  Boat launches are available at the Nine Mile Recreation areas and the Lake Spokane campground.

References

Further reading
Mueller, Marge. Washington State Parks: A Complete Guide, The Mountaineers Books, 2004, .

External links

Riverside State Park Washington State Parks and Recreation Commission 
Riverside State Park Map Washington State Parks and Recreation Commission 
Riverside State Park Foundation

State parks of Washington (state)
Geography of Spokane, Washington
Museums in Spokane County, Washington
History museums in Washington (state)
Native American museums in Washington (state)
Civilian Conservation Corps in Washington (state)
Parks in Spokane County, Washington
Protected areas established in 1933